is a former professional baseball outfielder in Japan's Nippon Professional Baseball. in  he was voted into the Japanese Baseball Hall of Fame. He ranks second all time in the NPB for stolen bases, with 596. He is also a member of the Meikyukai.

References

External links
Baseball reference

1936 births
Living people
Baseball people from Hiroshima
Japanese baseball players
Nankai Hawks players
Managers of baseball teams in Japan
Fukuoka SoftBank Hawks managers
Japanese Baseball Hall of Fame inductees